Grand-Baie is a quartier of Terre-de-Bas Island, located in Îles des Saintes archipelago in the Caribbean. It is located in the southeastern part of the island.

To See
Anchorage of Grand-Baie and ruins of the old pottery factory.

Populated places in Îles des Saintes
Quartiers of Îles des Saintes